The Electoral Palace in Bonn is the former residential palace of the Prince-Electors of Cologne. Since 1818, it has been the University of Bonn's main building in the city center, home to the University administration and the faculty of humanities and theology.

It was built by Enrico Zuccalli for the prince-elector Joseph Clemens of Bavaria from 1697 to 1705. The Hofgarten, a large park in front of the main building, is a popular place for students to meet, study and relax. The Hofgarten was repeatedly a place for political demonstrations, as for example the demonstration against the NATO Double-Track Decision on 22 October 1981, with about 250,000 participants.

References

External links

Buildings and structures in Bonn
University of Bonn
Palaces in North Rhine-Westphalia
Episcopal palaces in Germany